Bulatao is a surname. Notable people with the surname include:

Brian Bulatao (born 1964), American businessman and government official
Jaime C. Bulatao (1922–2015), Filipino Jesuit priest and psychologist